South Town is a hamlet situated in the civil parish of Medstead, Hampshire.

The nearest railway station is the restored Medstead & Four Marks station on the Watercress Line, trains from which connect with the nearest national rail station  to the northeast, at Alton.

Hamlets in Hampshire